Amelia Smart (born 8 January 1998) is a Canadian World Cup alpine ski racer.

Career

Junior
Smart was part of Canada's team at the 2016 Winter Youth Olympics, where she competed in four events. Smart's best placement was an 8th-place finish in the combined event.

At the World Junior Alpine Skiing Championships 2019 in Italy, Smart had a career best 7th-place finish in the slalom event.

Senior
At Smart's first World Championships in 2021, Smart finished in 27th in the slalom event. In June 2021, Smart was named to Canada's national team for the 2021–22 season.

On January 21, 2022, Smart was named to Canada's 2022 Olympic team.

World Cup results

Season standings

Top ten finishes
0 podiums; 3 top tens

World Championship results

Olympic results

References

External links 

1998 births
Living people
Canadian female alpine skiers
Sportspeople from British Columbia
Alpine skiers at the 2016 Winter Youth Olympics
Alpine skiers at the 2022 Winter Olympics
Olympic alpine skiers of Canada
People from North Vancouver
21st-century Canadian women